Frigg Oslo Fotballklubb is a Norwegian sports club from Majorstua in Oslo.

It has sections for association football and bandy.

History
It was founded on 17 May 1904 as SK Frigg, named after Frigg of Norse mythology. It was merged on 21 April 1954 with SK Varg. It took the name Frigg Oslo FK in 1990. The club colors are white and blue, and the team plays at Marienlyst stadion. It has a training field at Tørteberg not far from Marienlyst.

As the name indicates it is mainly a football club. It formerly had a handball team; the women's team became national champions in 1962 and 1964. The men's football team played for many years in the Norwegian top flight, and won the Norwegian football cup in 1914, 1916 and 1921. It had several players for the Norwegian national team, including Harald Hennum and Per Pettersen. Frigg last played in the top flight in 1973. The team currently plays in the Norwegian Third Division, having been relegated from the 2022 Norwegian Second Division.

European record

Recent history 
{|class="wikitable"
|-bgcolor="#efefef"
! Season
! 
! Pos.
! Pl.
! W
! D
! L
! GS
! GA
! P
!Cup
!Notes
|-
|2008
|3. divisjon
|align=right |2
|align=right|22||align=right|15||align=right|4||align=right|3
|align=right|73||align=right|18||align=right|49
||First round
|
|-
|2009
|3. divisjon
|align=right bgcolor=#DDFFDD| 1
|align=right|22||align=right|20||align=right|0||align=right|2
|align=right|81||align=right|21||align=right|60
||First round
|Promoted
|-
|2010
|2. divisjon
|align=right |9
|align=right|26||align=right|8||align=right|10||align=right|8
|align=right|44||align=right|48||align=right|34
||First round
|
|-
|2011 
|2. divisjon
|align=right |6
|align=right|24||align=right|11||align=right|4||align=right|9
|align=right|47||align=right|40||align=right|37
||First round
|
|-
|2012 
|2. divisjon
|align=right |8
|align=right|26||align=right|9||align=right|5||align=right|12
|align=right|53||align=right|58||align=right|32
||First round
|
|-
|2013
|2. divisjon
|align=right bgcolor="#FFCCCC"| 12
|align=right|26||align=right|7||align=right|4||align=right|15
|align=right|42||align=right|45||align=right|25
||First round
|Relegated
|-
|2014 
|3. divisjon
|align=right |2
|align=right|26||align=right|19||align=right|3||align=right|4
|align=right|73||align=right|23||align=right|60
||First round
|
|-
|2015
|3. divisjon
|align=right bgcolor=#DDFFDD| 1
|align=right|26||align=right|17||align=right|7||align=right|2
|align=right|71||align=right|29||align=right|58
||Second qual. round
|Promoted
|-
|2016 
|2. divisjon
|align=right bgcolor="#FFCCCC"| 11
|align=right|26||align=right|7||align=right|5||align=right|14
|align=right|37||align=right|62||align=right|26
||First round
|Relegated
|-
|2017 
|3. divisjon
|align=right| 6
|align=right|26||align=right|11||align=right|3||align=right|12
|align=right|55||align=right|44||align=right|36
||First round
|
|-
|2018 
|3. divisjon
|align=right| 2
|align=right|26||align=right|16||align=right|7||align=right|3
|align=right|64||align=right|14||align=right|55
||First round
|
|-
|2019 
|3. divisjon
|align=right| 8
|align=right|26||align=right|10||align=right|4||align=right|12
|align=right|38||align=right|55||align=right|34
||First round
|
|-
|2020
|colspan="11"|Season cancelled
|-
|2021
|3. divisjon
|align=right bgcolor=#DDFFDD| 1
|align=right|13||align=right|11||align=right|2||align=right|0
|align=right|48||align=right|10||align=right|35
||First round
|Promoted
|-
|2022
|2. divisjon
|align=right bgcolor="#FFCCCC"| 14
|align=right|26||align=right|6||align=right|2||align=right|18
|align=right|38||align=right|65||align=right|20
||Second round
|Relegated
|}
Source:

Honours 
 Norwegian Cup:
 Winners (3): 1914, 1916, 1921
 Runners-up (3): 1919, 1920, 1965

Bandy
The men's bandy team played four cup finals in 1917, 1923, 1947 and 1948 but lost all. They were relegated from the 1st division (2nd tier) after the 2019/2020 season.

References

External links

 Official site 
 Frigg Oslo FK results

 
Eliteserien clubs
Football clubs in Oslo
Association football clubs established in 1904
Bandy clubs established in 1904
Bandy clubs in Norway
1904 establishments in Norway